Harker may refer to:

People
Harker (surname)

Municipalities
Harker, Cumbria, north of Carlisle, England
Harker, Florida, census-designated place located in Collier County, Florida
Harkers Island, North Carolina, census-designated place in Carteret County, North Carolina
Harker Heights, Texas, city in Bell County, Texas

Buildings
Fort Harker (Alabama), military fortification built during the American Civil War
Fort Harker (Kansas), military installation of the US Army from 1866 to 1872
The Harker School, private educational institution in San Jose, California, USA

Geographical features

Watercourses
Harker Creek (disambiguation), the names of several creeks in the USA
Harker's Run (Ohio), stream located in Preble County, Ohio, USA
Harker Run (West Virginia), stream located in Wetzel County, West Virginia, USA

Lakes
Harker Lake, shallow glacial lake in Kidder County, North Dakota, USA
Upper Harker Lake, shallow glacial lake located in Kidder County, North Dakota, USA
Harker Park Lake, lake located in Rio Blanco County, Colorado, USA

Land features
Harker Canyon (disambiguation), several canyons of that name in the USA
Harker Point on Bristol Island in the South Sandwich Islands
Mount Harker in Antarctica
Harker Glacier on the island of South Georgia

Extraterrestrial
Dorsa Harker, wrinkle ridge in Mare Crisium on the Moon

Video games
Harker (video game)

See also
Harkness (disambiguation)
Hark (disambiguation)
Harke & Burr, fictional comic book characters
Harkers, York, pub in England